A number of motor vessels have been named Jupiter, including

MV Jupiter (1952; IMO 5177456), cargo ship
, a passenger ship which sank in 1988 after a collision
, a cruise ship in service during 1966 and from 1986–90
, a ferry in service 1969–92
, a ferry in service 1990–94
 (IMO 7341051), a Ro-ro ferry in service 1974–2011
MV Jupiter (1974; IMO 7336575), cargo ship (Georgia)
, a ferry in service 1975–81
MV Jupiter I (1985; IMO 8416724), cargo ship
MV Jupiter (1998; IMO 9187203), trawler
MV Jupiter (2001; IMO 9226504), container ship
MV Jupiter (2006), Panamax bulk carrier

MV Jupiter II (2009; IMO 9467897), bulk carrier

 , a cruiseferry owned and operated by Vietnamese Jupiter Cruises
 , a Bahamas-registered Norwegian-operated cargo ship that sank in 2015

See also
 , a steamboat preserved in Philadelphia, Pennsylvania

 Jupiter (disambiguation)

Ship names